A digital tabletop game is a video game genre that includes video games that have gameplay similar to physical tabletop games, including board games, card games, and role-playing games. Many digital tabletop games are adaptions of existing physical games into the video games, though some of these are wholly digital games that use tabletop game mechanics. There are also tabletop game simulators that allow for users to recreate tabletop games from a variety of game pieces.

Types

Digital versions of physical games
Many digital tabletop games are simply virtual recreations of physical games, which can range from simple card games such as Microsoft Solitaire to complex tabletop ones such as Gloomhaven. The digital versions typically add in support for online play with other players as well as computer opponents for single players.

Video games emulating board games

There are classes of video games that are not based on any existing physical game property but which borrow heavily from board game principles as part of the gameplay mechanics, emulating the board game experience. One of the most notable titles of this sort is the Mario Party series of games, in which players move around a game board based on roll of one or more die, gaining or losing coins depending where they land. Periodically players then participate in a more action-based mini-game to earn bonus items towards winning the game.

Digital collectible card game

Digital collectible card games (DCCGs) are digital variants of collectible card games (CCG), in which players create decks of cards from their library to challenge other opponents. DCCGs followed the popularity of collectible card games like Magic: The Gathering in the 1990s as a way to play these games online with other players. Many early DCCGs were simply reproductions of the physical version of the game, but Hearthstone in 2014 created one of the first examples of a wholly digital CCG that could not be replicated in a physical game due to some of the game's rules, such as the ability to draw cards from nearly all those that have been published. Hearthstone led to a surge of new DCCG, both those recreating existing CCGs and novel digital-only titles.

Most DCCGs are server-based games with the player's library of cards retained on the server. Players can create multiple decks and challenge computer opponents or other players online. Winning games can earn the player booster packs to expand their library, or they can use microtransactions to buy additional cards.

Virtual tabletops 
Virtual tabletops (VTT) or tabletop simulators are video game programs that are designed to allow users to recreate existing games or create their own games to play with others online, such as Tabletop Simulator and Tabletopia. The game typically provided a game engine with numerous pre-made tabletop game assets like dice, tokens, and cards, and allows players to create or import their own. The game may have limited scripting ability so that some of the tabletop game's functions can be automated, but otherwise, players are expected to know the rules and play them out as given, simply using the virtual tabletop as a game board. This can create copyright concerns since art assets from the published game get distributed freely through user mods. Some tabletop game developers have embraced these programs by offering their games as official downloadable content for the simulator program.

Certain types of games have more specialized programs for that game type. For example, there are a number of virtual tabletop applications, both as standalone program and web applications designed around role-playing games that provide for character sheets and combat-related gameplay rulesets. Examples include Astral, Fantasy Grounds and Roll20. D&D Beyond was a fan-created means to play Dungeons & Dragons online that gained enough popularity leading to Wizards of the Coast to acquire the property and help expand out.

See also 
 Toys-to-life
 Augmented reality

References 

 
Video game genres